The 1983 Dutch Open was a Grand Prix tennis tournament staged in Hilversum, Netherlands. The tournament was played on outdoor clay courts and was held from 18 July until 24 July 1983. It was the 27th edition of the tournament. Tomáš Šmíd won the singles title.

Finals

Singles
 Tomáš Šmíd defeated  Balázs Taróczy 6–4, 6–4

Doubles
 Heinz Günthardt /  Balázs Taróczy defeated  Jan Kodeš /  Tomáš Šmíd 3–6, 6–2, 6–3

References

External links
 ITF tournament edition details

Dutch Open (tennis)
Dutch Open (tennis)
Dutch Open
Dutch Open
Dutch Open (tennis), 1983